Adam Montgomery (born 18 July 2002) is a Scottish professional footballer who plays as a left back for St Johnstone on loan from Celtic.

Career
Montgomery signed his first professional contract with Celtic in July 2019 and he extended his contract to 2025 in February 2021. After making the bench for the first team on four occasions, he made his professional debut for Celtic on 12 May 2021, starting in a 4–0 win over St Johnstone.

On 31 January 2022, Montgomery joined Aberdeen on loan until the end of the 2021–22 season.

Style of play
Montgomery came through the Celtic Academy as a forward, only converting to a defender ahead of his breakthrough in to the first team.

Honours
Celtic
Scottish Premiership: 2021–22
Scottish League Cup: 2021–22

References

External links

2002 births
Living people
Scottish footballers
Association football defenders
Scotland under-21 international footballers
Celtic F.C. players
Aberdeen F.C. players
Scottish Professional Football League players
Sportspeople from Livingston, West Lothian
Footballers from West Lothian
St Johnstone F.C. players